A steak is a thick cut of meat generally sliced across the muscle fibers, sometimes including a bone. It is normally grilled or fried. Steak can be diced, cooked in sauce, such as in steak and kidney pie, or minced and formed into patties, such as hamburgers.

Steaks are cut from animals including cattle, bison, buffalo, camel, goat, horse, kangaroo, sheep, ostrich, pigs, turkey, and deer, as well as various types of fish, especially salmon and large fish such as swordfish, shark, and marlin. For some meats, such as pork, lamb and mutton, chevon, and veal, these cuts are often referred to as chops. Some cured meat, such as gammon, is commonly served as steak.

Grilled portobello mushroom may be called mushroom steak, and similarly for other vegetarian dishes. Imitation steak is a food product that is formed into a steak shape from various pieces of meat. Grilled fruits such as watermelon have been used as vegetarian steak alternatives.

Exceptions, in which the meat is sliced parallel to the fibers, include the skirt steak cut from the plate, the flank steak cut from the abdominal muscles, and the silverfinger steak cut from the loin and including three rib bones. In a larger sense, fish steaks, ground meat steaks, pork steak, and many more varieties of steak are known.

In the United States, steak cut from cattle is also called "beefsteak".

Etymology
The word steak originates from the mid-15th century Scandinavian word steik, or stickna''' in the Middle English dialect, along with the Old Norse word steikja. The Oxford English Dictionary's first reference is to "a thick slice of meat cut for roasting or grilling or frying, sometimes used in a pie or pudding; especially a piece cut from the hind-quarters of the animal." Subsequent parts of the entry, however, refer to "steak fish", which referred to "cod of a size suitable for cutting into steaks", and also "steak-raid", which was a custom among Scottish Highlanders of giving some cattle being driven through a gentleman's land to the owner. An early written usage of the word "stekys" comes from a 15th-century cookbook, and makes reference to both beef or venison steaks.

Production

Livestock for meat to be used as steak cuts may be raised on a farm or ranch. The meat from various wild game may also be used for steak cuts.

Marketing and sales

Countries with enough suitable land for grazing animals, in particular cattle, have a history of production and culinary use of steak. Such countries include Argentina, Ireland, New Zealand, Australia, South Africa, the United States, and the United Kingdom. In Asian countries, such as China and South Korea, steak is traditionally sliced and stir-fried and served in smaller amounts as part of a mixed dish.

Argentina
In Argentina, beef represents a large portion of the country's export market. A total of 11.8 million animals was harvested in 2010. The country has one of the largest consumptions of beef per capita worldwide, and much of it is grilled steak. Beef steak consumption is described as part of the "Argentine national identity". In 2010, 244,000 cattle producers were in Argentina. In Argentina, steakhouses are referred to as  parrillas, which are common throughout the country. Portion sizes of steak dishes in Argentine restaurants tend to be large, with steaks weighing over  being commonplace. Asado is a traditional dish that often includes steak and is also the standard word for "grilled" in Argentina and other countries. Asado is considered a national dish of the country.

Australia
Domestic and international marketing of Australian beef is undertaken by Meat & Livestock Australia, a corporation which runs programs related to quality assurance, sustainable production, and environmental considerations, through organizations such as Meat Standards Australia.

Ireland
The Irish agricultural beef market is a contributor to the economy of Ireland. A significant amount of Irish beef is exported to other countries, with over 50% going to the United Kingdom.

New Zealand
The "Steak of Origin" competition has been run for a decade on behalf of the Beef+Lamb Corporation of New Zealand. It "aims to find the most tender and tasty sirloin steak" in the country. Criteria for judging claims to include tenderness, pH, marbling and percentage cooking loss", but while these data are collected for each entrant steak, only the shear force (correlated to perceived tenderness) determines qualification to a tasting panel, at which objective taste from a panel determines the winner. The pH is used solely to disqualify entrants and neither the 'marbling' or the cooking loss have any effect on the outcome of the competition at any stage. Their parallel competition, which they run for lamb legs (glammies) does take into account some of these other metrics when weighting the entrants for their ranking within the competition.

United Kingdom

According to a survey by trade magazine Caterer and Hotelkeeper, the most popular dinner menu in British restaurants in the 1980s included steak: prawn cocktail, steak and Black Forest gateau.

Cattle breeds such as Hereford or Aberdeen Angus date back to the 1700s, and farmers continue to raise cattle sired by registered pedigree bulls. Bullocks, which live outdoors year-round, grow slowly as they would in their natural habitat, ultimately producing a distinctly tender meat. Around 2,200,000 cattle are slaughtered for beef each year in the United Kingdom.

United States
In the United States, cuts of beef for retail sale include various beefsteaks, as well as stew meat and hamburger meat. In the U.S. circa 1956, about 24% of retail beef cuts were steaks.

Beef production is the largest single agricultural venture in the United States, with 687,540 farms raising cattle and over a million in the production process, as of the 2007 Agriculture Census.  On average, a single farm typically raises about 50 cattle at a time, with 97% of the cattle farms classified as one of these small family farms.  These smaller farms average a gross cash income of $62,286 per year as of 2007.

Cooking

Beef steaks are commonly grilled or fried. Grilled beef steaks can be cooked at different temperatures, or for different lengths of time; the resulting cooked steak ranges from blue (very rare) to overdone. The most common characteristics of a rare steak is a soft, cold, red center. The outside is seared for flavor, while the inside is cooked to suit the diner's preference. Steaks cooked well done are usually cooked throughout the entire cut of meat. For example, a beefsteak cooked well done will not have any pinkness in the middle when sliced. Uncooked beef steak can be served raw, such as in steak tartare.

Fish steaks are generally cooked for a short time, as the flesh cooks quickly, especially when grilled. Fish steaks, such as tuna, can also be cooked to various temperatures, such as rare and medium rare. Different cuts of steak include rib eye, sirloin, tenderloin, rump, porterhouse, and t-bone.

Cuts of steak differ between countries owing to differences in farming the animal and butchering the carcass. The result is that a steak found in one country is not the same as in another, although the recipes may be the same, differing "only in their sauces, butters, or garnitures".

Most important is trying to achieve Maillard reaction on meat to ensure that restaurant-quality steak results each time.

Dining

Steak has become a popular dish in many places around the world, cooked in domestic and professional kitchens, and is often a primary ingredient in a menu. It is used in small amounts in an hors d'oeuvre, in an entrée dish or, more usually, in a larger amount as the main course. Steak has also been an important breakfast dish, especially for people undertaking hard outdoor work, such as farmers.  Diners ordering steak at a restaurant typically advise the chef or waiter of their preferences regarding the degree of cooking, using the terms "rare", "medium rare", "medium", "medium well", or "well done".  Print appearances of this use of "rare" are found as early as around 1615. A steak knife is a specialized piece of cutlery to make cutting the steak easier; it is sharper than other knives and may have a serrated edge.

Steak clubs

Beefsteak Clubs were once part of London's club life. They were described as "a club of ancient institution in every theatre; when the principal performers dined one day in the week together (generally Saturday), and authors and other geniuses were admitted members." Dr Johnson's club in Ivy lane was originally a Beef-Steak Club and the "Rump-Steak or Liberty Club" was in existence from 1733–34. The present-day Beefsteak Club, established in 1876, is at 9 Irving Street, London. Among its members are many notable people.

Steakhouses
A steakhouse is a restaurant that specializes in beefsteaks and other individual portions of meat. Chophouses started in London in the 1690s, and served individual portions of meat, known as chops. The houses were normally only open for men; for example, women were only admitted to Stone's Chop House in 1921. Accounts of travellers in 19th-century London refer to their "dining off mutton chop, rump steak and a 'weal' cutlet", as well as hams and sirloins.

Delmonico's restaurant in New York City, which opened in 1827 and stayed open for almost 100 years, has been described as "the most famous steak restaurant in American history". Delmonico steak refers to a method of preparation from one of several cuts of beef (typically the rib cut) prepared Delmonico style, originally from the mid-19th century.

Hundreds of restaurants continue to specialize in serving steak, describing themselves as "steakhouses".

Sauces and condiments

Classic sauces and seasonings to accompany steak include:
 Béarnaise sauce
 Café de Paris sauce
 Compound butters such as parsley butter (to create Entrecôte à la Bretonne), garlic butter or snail butter
 Demi-glace, a rich brown sauce in French cuisine used in the preparation of Tournedos Rossini Mustard
 Horseradish cream
 Fresh Rosemary
 Pepper
 Peppercorn sauceSauce Nivernaise Sautéed mushrooms
 White wine, to create Tournedos au vin blanc Worcestershire sauce, a traditional commercial condiment
Commercially produced bottled sauces for steak and pre-mixed spices are also popular. In 2012 in the U.S., A1 Steak Sauce had slightly over 50% of the market share for all meat sauce products, and was the category leader. Montreal steak seasoning is a spice mix used to flavor steak and grilled meats that was based on the pickling dry-rub mix used in preparing Montreal smoked meat.

Cultural significance

Steak and other meat products can be frozen and exported, but before the invention of commercial refrigeration, transporting meat over long distances was impossible. Communities had to rely on what was locally available, which determined the forms and tradition of meat consumption. Hunter-gathering peoples cut steaks from local indigenous animals. For example, Sami cuisine relies partly on the meat of the reindeer; the Inuit diet uses locally caught sea-mammal meat from whales; Indigenous Australians ate kangaroo; and indigenous North American food included bison steak. In the Middle East, meat recipes from medieval times onwards simply state "meat" without specifying the kind or cut; "apart from an occasional gazelle, kid or camel", only lamb and mutton were eaten because cattle were seldom bred.

In contemporary Argentina, where steak consumption is very high, steak is a significant part of the national cuisine and the asado has the status of a national dish. Advice on butchery and recipes for American black bear steak and chops is provided by New Jersey (US) government.

 Opposition 

Some vegetarians, vegans, and animal rights activists have mounted protests against steakhouses.Lhendup G Bhutia, "The Radical Vegetarians Are Coming For Your Steak Knives", International Blvd, 13 March 2015

Types

Beefsteak

Beefsteak has been categorized into various cuts. The more tender cuts, from the loin and rib, are generally cooked quickly, using dry heat, and served whole.  Less tender cuts from the chuck or round are generally cooked with moist heat or are mechanically tenderized (e.g., cube steak).

Beefsteak is graded for quality, with higher prices for higher quality. For example, beef tenderloin is the most tender, while wagyu, such as Kobe beef from Japan, is also known for its high quality. 

The quality and safety of beefsteak as a food product is regulated by law. Australia has National Meat Accreditation standards;  Canada has the Canadian Beef Grading Agency; in the United Kingdom, the Food Standards Agency is responsible; in the United States, young beef is graded by the United States Department of Agriculture as Select, Choice or Prime, where "Prime" refers to beef of the highest quality, typically that which has significant marbling. In 1996 in the U.S., only 2.4% of cattle were graded as prime, and most Prime beef is sold in restaurants and hotels.

Beefsteak can be cooked to a level of very rare (bleu, a cold raw center), rare, medium rare, medium, medium well, or well done. More tender cuts can be cooked relatively quickly at very high temperatures, such as by broiling or grilling. Pittsburgh rare is charred on the outside. Beef, unlike some other meats, does not need to be cooked through. Food-borne human illnesses are not normally found within a beefsteak, though surfaces can potentially be contaminated from handling, thus very rare steak (seared on the outside and raw within) is generally accepted as safe.

The wide range of quickly-prepared and well-known beefsteak dishes includes minute steak, steak sandwiches, and steak and eggs. "Surf and turf", which combines meat and fish, requires more time to prepare. Steak meat is also often minced, shredded, chopped finely or formed to create a range of dishes that retain the name "steak":
 Chicken fried steak – a breaded cutlet dish consisting of a piece of steak (tenderized cube steak) coated with seasoned flour and pan-fried. It is associated with U.S. Southern cuisine.
 Hamburg steak or steak burger – a beefsteak shaped into a patty to be cooked after being minced. It is similar to the Salisbury steak. Made popular worldwide by the migrating Germans, it became a mainstream dish around the start of the 19th century.
 Salisbury steak, first recorded in 1897 and named after James Salisbury, a doctor during the American Civil War, who recommended people eat hamburger three times per day. During World War I, American soldiers replaced the German-derived word "hamburger" with "Salisbury steak" for political reasons.
 Restructured steak – a class of beefsteaks made from smaller pieces of beef fused together by a binding agent. Its development started in the 1970s.

Fish steak

Fish steaks are cut perpendicular to the spine and may include bones. Although their delicate flesh requires quicker cooking than beef, steaks from swordfish, halibut, tuna, salmon, and mahi-mahi can be grilled. They are frequently cooked whole or as fillets. Fish steaks may also be poached or baked using a court bouillon, wine or sauce or cooked en papillote''.

Lamb steak

Lamb steaks come from a range of cuts and are a versatile ingredient that can be used in a range of dishes. It is commonly found sliced into salads.

Pork steak

Pork steaks are generally cut from the shoulder of the pig but can also be cut from the loin or leg of the pig. Shoulder steaks are cut from the same primal cut of meat most commonly used for pulled pork and can be quite tough without long cooking times due to the high amount of collagen in the meat; therefore, pork shoulder steaks are often cooked slower than a typical beef steak and may be stewed or simmered in barbecue sauce during cooking.

Cooked gammon steaks are a component of a full breakfast, whereas steaks from a rolled pork loin are more likely to be served at lunch.

A Boston butt is a pork steak originating from colonial New England, where butchers would pack fewer valuable cuts of pork in barrels, called butts.

Chicken steak 
Thick sliced or chopped and formed chicken is used to create mainly traditional southern dishes such as chicken fried chicken. This may also refer to beef cuts such as a hip steak or a shoulder blade steak, or a small portion of chuck steak with a visible line of white connective tissue.

Vegetarian alternatives
Sliced vegetables can be used as vegetarian nonmeat "steak" alternatives, such as cauliflower, portobello mushrooms, and eggplant. Beans and legumes (such as soybeans) have also been used to form steak-like foods. Watermelon steaks are sliced and cooked pieces of watermelon.

In 2019, the European Union included steak as one of the protected designations under a revised regulation that passed with 80% approval. The decision will be put to member states and the European commission. The change was “designed to protect meat-related terms and names exclusively for edible parts of the animals”. It was felt that “steak should be kept for real steak with meat” and that a new name was needed for new non-meat products so that people know what they are eating.

See also

 List of beef dishes
 Meat on the bone

References

Further reading
 

 
Beef
Barbecue
Fish dishes
Pork dishes
Lamb dishes
American cuisine
European cuisine